John Joseph Fina (born March 11, 1969) is a former American football offensive lineman, who spent eleven years in the National Football League, ten of those with the Buffalo Bills, and a one-year stint with the Arizona Cardinals. Fina attended Salpointe Catholic High School where he was first-team All-State his senior year, and is one of the several players in school history to have their jersey retired. Fina attended the University of Arizona where he was a brother of Sigma Phi Epsilon. He was drafted by the Buffalo Bills in the 1st round, 27th overall, in the 1992 NFL Draft. He played in two Super Bowls, XXVII and XXVIII, however the Bills lost both of them to the Dallas Cowboys. He now resides in Tucson, Arizona.

On April 6, 2010, Fina appeared on the Travel Channel's show Food Wars as one of the guest judges. The food war was over the Sonoran hot dog and was between "BK's Carne Asada & Hot Dogs" and "El Güero Canelo". Both restaurants are located in Tucson, Arizona. BK's won the food war by a score of 4-1 with Fina voting for BK's hot dog.

Fina has multiple children and resides in Tucson, Arizona with his family.

1969 births
Living people
Sportspeople from Rochester, Minnesota
American football offensive tackles
Arizona Wildcats football players
Arizona Cardinals players
Buffalo Bills players